Sergei Zonov (born 18 July 1966 Sillamäe) is an Estonian politician. He was a member of VII Riigikogu.

References

Living people
1966 births
Members of the Riigikogu, 1992–1995
People from Sillamäe
Estonian people of Russian descent